() (16 April 1813 – 26 December 1846) was the Maharaja of the Kingdom of Travancore. He is also considered as a brilliant music composer and is credited with over 400 classical compositions in both Carnatic and Hindustani style.

A well-formulated code of laws, courts of justice, introduction of English education, construction of an observatory, installation of the first Government printing press, establishment of the first manuscripts library were amongst the many initiatives taken by Svāti Tirunāḷ‍, as a King, to modernise Travancore.

Early life 

Svāti Tirunāḷ‍ was born into the Venad dynasty of the Matrilineal royal family of Travancore, which is now a part of Kerala, on 16 April 1813. He was the second child of Queen Gowri Lakshmi Bayi who ruled Travancore from 1811 to 1815, and Raja Raja Varma Koil Thampuran of Changanasseri Palace, and the elder son. While in the womb itself, he was proclaimed King and thus was referred to as Garbha Sreemaan. He was born in Svati star, and this is the reason why he was named Swathi Thirunal. He reigned under the regency of his mother from 1813 to 1815 and then under the regency of his maternal aunt Gowri Parvati Bayi until 1829. When he was just four months old, his mother invited Colonel John Munro, representative of the East India Company, and his officials and declared in the Durbar that she was entrusting the East India Company with the care of her child and expected the company to co-operate with him in future.

In 1829 Svāti Tirunāḷ‍ reached majority at 16 and assumed full powers of ruler and reigned as the Maharajah of Travancore until his death in 1846. He had an elder sister, Gowri Rukmini Bayi, whose children ascended the Travancore musnud consecutively. Her only daughter was the mother of Moolam Thirunal. He had a younger brother, Uthram Thirunal Marthanda Varma, who succeeded him in 1846 and ruled Travancore until his demise in 1860.

Irayimman Thampi, the famous poet-composer wrote perhaps the most famous Malayalam lullaby  Omanathinkal Kidavo, about Svāti Tirunāḷ‍ when he was born.

Education 
Both his aunt/foster mother, who was well-versed in music, and his father, a Sanskrit scholar, took special care about his education. Col. Munro also is said to have taken a keen interest in his education. He started learning Malayalam and Sanskrit at the age of six and English at the age of seven. The young Prince studied several languages, including Malayalam, Kannada, Tamil, Hindustani, Telugu, Marathi, Sanskrit, English and Persian. He impressed all his teachers, and even guests from abroad, with his keen understanding of not only languages but also other subjects like geometry. P. Sankunni Menon (A History of Travancore from the Earliest Times, 1878) records an incident between young Svāti Tirunāḷ‍ and Col. Welsh, a visiting British officer, that the word geometry and words like hexagon, heptagon and so on were derived from Sanskrit. Colonel Welsh summed up the boy King's genius as follows :Swati Tirunal, now thirteen... took up a book of mathematics and selecting the forty-seventh proposition of Euclid sketched the figure on a country slate but what astonished me most was his telling us in English that Geometry was derived from the Sanskrit, which as Jaw metor (Jyamiti) to measure the earth and that many of our mathematical terms were also derived from the same source such as hexagon, heptagon, octagon... This promising boy is now, I conclude, sovereign of the finest country in India for he was to succeed to the Musnud (throne) the moment he had attained his 16th year.

Family 
In 1829, at the age of sixteen, Maharajah Svāti Tirunāḷ‍ married Thiruvattar Ammachi Panapillai Amma Srimathi Ayikutty Narayani Pillai Thankachi, a famed beauty of the Thiruvattar Ammaveedu family, was an expert Carnatic singer and Veena player. Once there was a minor quarrel between Narayani Pillai Ammachi and her husband, the King. The quarrel continued for some days; the Ammachi approached Irayimman Thampi for a solution. According to researchers he then created the famous Malayalam Padam (song) Prananaathan Enikku Nalkiya and told the Ammachi to sing it loudly in the King's presence; after hearing it the King was pleased and they reconciled immediately. This particular work of Thampi is considered by experts as one of the most beautiful Shringara (erotic) Padams available in Malayalam. Together they had three children but in 1839 Narayani Pillai Ammachi died, leaving behind a son, Thiruvattar Chithira Nal Ananthapadmanabhan Chempakaraman Thampi. A few months later, for the care of the baby, the Maharajah married another lady called Neelamma Pillai Ammachi by adopting her into the Thiruvattar Ammaveedu. He later married Sundara Lakshmi in 1843, a Saiva Mudaliar dancer, after adopting her into Vadasseri Ammaveedu. The story of the dancer Sugandhavalli who didn't get along with the King's first wife, Narayani Pillai Thankachi, has been disproved by R.P. Raja as nothing but fiction in his research treatise 'New Light on Swathi Thirunal'. In 1845 the King constructed the Thanjavur Ammaveedu for his third consort. Sundara Lakshmi, a great devotee of Lord Ganapati and Kanjirottu Yakshi Amma, resided there until her death in 1856.

As Reigning Maharajah of Travancore 

Svāti Tirunāḷ‍ took over the reins of Travancore from his aunt, Gowri Parvati Bayi (she was the Regent for Svāti Tirunāḷ‍ in his boyhood) at the age of sixteen. He appointed his tutor, Sri Subba Rao, as the Prime Minister (Diwan). One of his first moves was to shift the government secretariat from Kollam (about seventy-five kilometers away) to Thiruvananthapuram. This enabled him to give personal attention to government affairs. He took steps to curb corruption in the government and told even the Diwan to resign when he heard that the Diwan had acted to favour a particular party in a land dispute. He started an English school in Thiruvananthapuram in 1834, which came to be called the Maharajah's Government Free School and later became Maharajah's High School and then Maharajah's College. It is now the University College. Later, similar schools were started at many other places. He also implemented reforms in the legal sector, starting Munsif, District and Appellate Courts and modernizing laws. He identified one Kandan Menon from Malabar and appointed him as Huzoor Diwan Peshkar to bring about legal reforms. Another of his achievements was to settle many land disputes by carrying out a resurvey of the land, in which also Menon helped him. He also conducted the first census of the state in 1836. As per the census, the population of Travancore was 128, 068.

Svāti Tirunāḷ‍ was also instrumental in bringing modern medicine to the state. He appointed a European as the palace physician. He was also given the responsibility of providing medical assistance to local people, for which hospitals were started. It is this post that was known as Surgeon General till the formation of Kerala State. He also started an engineering department, which was placed under the command of one Lieutenant Horsley. The Karamana bridge was built at that time.

Criticism 

Despite the progress achieved in varied fields under Swathi Thirunal's reign, the Kingdom of Travancore, like the rest of British India, was in the grip of extreme caste discrimination against Hindu 18 class. According to the followers of the movement called Ayya Vazhi (the path of Ayya Vaikundar) and historians, a social reformer and iconoclast Ayya Vaikundar, an incarnation of Hindu Deity Vishnu) severely criticized Swathi Thirunal for the then prevalent caste discrimination against 18 class in Travancore. He referred to the King as Ananthapuri Neechan (vile man of Ananthapuri); referred to the Brahmins and the British as Karineechanmar (vile Black cheaters) and Venneechanmar (vile White cheaters), respectively. The caste Hindus then complained to Swathi Thirunal that Vaikundar was cheating people by claiming to be god and as a result of the complaint, Swathi Thirunal ordered to arrest him but Vaikundar was later released by the government. In the then society, 18 class men and women weren't allowed to cover their upper body as it was considered a privilege reserved for caste Hindus & people of other religions. Vaikundar exhorted dalits to fight against this and organized revolts to get their due rights which came to be known as Melmundu Samaram (Upper Cloth Revolt). As a result of the revolt, the government changed the laws and allowed dalit men & women to wear upper clothes. Several taxes on the 18 class were also repealed by the Maharajah after protests. According to the websites on Ayya Vaikundar, Maharajah Swathi Thirunal too had become a disciple of his.

Astronomy and Trivandrum Observatory 
Another area where Svāti Tirunāḷ‍ took interest was in astronomy. He wished to compare Western findings with Indian knowledge. He had knowledge of observatories in Madras and others. Finding that there was so much in common between the western astronomy and Indian (eastern) astrological understanding of planets, stars and about the known universe; Swāthi Tirunāḷ‍ set the initiative to start an observatory. One of its director would be his relative, Raja Rama Varma Rohani Thirunal, Prince of Mavelikara Royal family who were related to Swathi Thirunal who was an established astronomer and a member of the British and Canadian Astronomical Societies.
The observatory benefited from British talents in Colonel Fraser and Caldecott. A cotton mill expert John Caldecott FRS was interested in astronomy but self-taught, and later became one of its directors. Caldecott, an industrial representative who lived in Alapuzha, used to make instruments for astronomical observations and initially mounted viewing instruments on top of mango tree in Residency of Quilon, Cochin and his Allepey homes. Raja Swathi Tirunal saw his collection and asked him to come to Trivandrum to start a similar set-up.

The current observatory site was chosen on top of a laterite mount near the Kanakakunnu hill, which was observed as having the best western sky views in that hemisphere, being near the equator and the sea. He was instrumental in buying telescopes and tools to Trivandrum via ship through the Middle east from England. It became a part of the Travancore University, but for some time was administered as an independent government institution. It is now the oldest institution under the Kerala University. Started in 1837, some of the equipment is still to be seen at the Thiruvananthapuram observatory (now under the Department of Physics, University of Kerala).

Trivandrum Public Library (now State Central Library) and the Oriental Manuscript Library were started by Swathi Thirunāḷ‍, the Museum and Zoo in Thiruvananthapuram as well. The Maharajah was also an honorary member of the Royal Asiatic Society from 1843. Maharajah Svāti Tirunāḷ‍ also put an end to the barbaric punishment called the 'SUCHINDRAM KAIMUKKU' According to which the accused was forced to prove his innocence by dipping his hand in boiled ghee at Suchindram temple, and he was punished if the hand get burnt. He is also credited with starting the first government press (the only press at that time was CMS Press in Kottayam).

A report on the English schools in Travancore appeared in The Gardner's Magazine of 1841, wrote about the administrative reforms brought in by Maharajah Svāti Tirunāḷ‍:Rajah of Travancore, the great promoter of science in the East, was only twenty-eight years of age, and had not reigned more than ten years, yet, during that short period, he had caused himself to be distinguished by his accomplishments as well as by his' liberality. They would, no doubt, be interested in learning that this prince was educated by his prime minister— a rare tutor for a sovereign.

The Rajah had established schools within his dominions—he had established a mathematical school under English superintendence; but he had done more—he had done what, he was sorry to say, had neither been done in England, Scotland, nor Ireland—be had established a school in every village of his dominions— and be gave education to every child, male and female – a change in Indian customs that might lead to the happiest results. He was informed, on good authority, that there was not a child who had reached eight years of age not capable of reading and writing; but this distinguished prince, not satisfied with advancing the interests of elementary education, had established an observatory, and placed in it an English gentleman, a member of the Royal Society of London, and who was in that room – he meant Mr. Caldecott. In this observatory, observations were carried on with the same success as under British interests. The Rajah had also established a magnetical and meteorological observatory, having been led to do so by becoming acquainted with a report on Meteorology, published by the British Association. And the observations taken there were found to be as accurate as those taken in Edinburgh, Philadelphia, and other places.

Contributions to Music and Literature 
Svāti Tirunāḷ‍ was deeply interested in music right from childhood. Besides being an able ruler, he was a patron of music and was a musician himself. Researchers say that Svāti Tirunāḷ‍ affixed his compositions with the mudra Padmanabha  padumanabha, sarasijanaabha, etc. and its synonyms. His education in music started with the first lessons from Karamana Subrahmania Bhagavathar and Karamana Padmanabha Bhagavathar. Later, he studied music from the then English scholar, Thanjavur Subba Rao as well. He continued to learn music by listening to accomplished musicians and practising himself. He encouraged both broad systems of Indian music, Hindustani and Carnatic music, though he was essentially a connoisseur of the Carnatic music tradition. He is credited with composing over 400 compositions in Carnatic and Hindustani music. Some of his favourite compositions were Padmanabha Pahi, Deva Deva, Devanke, Sarasijanabha and Sree Ramana Vibho. Svāti Tirunāḷ‍ was fluent in a number of languages including Malayalam, Sanskrit, Marathi, Telugu, Kannada, Hindustani, Bengali, Tamil, Oriya and English. This was a period when music and art were thriving in many parts of south India. The triumvirate of Carnatic music, Tyagaraja (1767–1847), Syama Sastri (1762–1827) and Muthuswami Dikshitar (1775–1835), lived and enriched music during this period. Svāti Tirunāḷ‍'s palace also was home to many musicians and artistes of the period, including the famous Thanjavur Quartet brothers, Tyagaraja's disciple Kannayya Bhagavathar, Ananthapadmanabha Goswami (a Maharashtrian singer known as Kokilakanthameru swami), Shadkala Govinda Marar, and many others.

The literary works of Maharajah Svāti Tirunāḷ‍ include Bhakti Manjari', Syanandurapuravarnana Prabandham, Padmanabhasatakam, Muhanaprasa Antyaprasa Vyavastha, Ajamila, Kuchela Upakhyanas and Utsava Varnana Prabandha.

Death 
As a monarch, Svāti Tirunāḷ‍ was incredibly hardworking and supremely committed to his kingdom and people. The appointment of General Cullen as the Resident of Travancore, was the beginning of the end for the Maharajah.
Historian P. Shungunny Menon wrote: Resident Jerond Cullen assumed almost sovereign authority. Such was his oppressive intrusion in the administration. The king was made totally powerless. Compounding this atrocity was the machinations of his aide Krishna Rao, who schemed with Cullen for his own personal gain. What ever the reason, the Resident's intrusion in the administration was unbearable for the young King. To compound his problems, the deaths of his elder sister, father, wife Narayani and all three children (Narayani's) made the Maharajah distraught. He increasingly sought silence and solitude, weakening his mind and body. Thus, at the age of 33, Maharajah Swathi Thirunal died on 26 December 1846.
The demise of Maharajah Svāthi Thirunāḷ‍ attracted the attention of even the foreign press. Allen's Indian Mail and Register of Intelligence of British &Foreign India, China, & All Parts of the East wrote :

The Journal the Royal Asiatic Society of Great Britain and Ireland ran an obituary in 1847 which mourned that,

Legacy

Swathi Sangeethotsavam 

Prince Rama Varma, renowned South Indian Classical musician and descendant of Swathi Thirunal, organizes the  Swathi Sangeethotsavam, a 10-day music festival featuring exclusively the compositions of Maharaja Swathi Thirunal. Eminent Carnatic and Hindustani musicians participate in this unique musical event, which is conducted every year from 4 to 13 January at Kuthira Malika, Trivandrum and attracts music aficionados from across the globe.

Swathi Sangeetha Puraskaram 
The award Swathi Sangeetha Puraskaram is instituted in the name of Maharajah Swathi Thirunal of Travancore to honour those musicians who have made valuable contributions to the field of music. It is also the highest honour for musicians by the Government of Kerala, India.

In popular culture 
In 1987, a Malayalam film titled Swathi Thirunal based on his life was released. It was directed by Lenin Rajendran. It stars Anant Nag in the title role, and Srividya, Ambika, Nedumudi Venu and Murali in other important roles.

Sree Swathi Thirunal Maharaja, a 1967 documentary film about the king, directed by K. T. John, was produced by the Government of India's Films Division.

Compositions

Notes

See also 
 List of Carnatic composers
 Thunchath Ezhuthachan Malayalam University
 Prince Aswathi Thirunal Rama Varma, a descendant

References 
WELCOME - Dr. Achuthsankar S. Nair, Hon. Director, Centre for Bioinformatics, Thiruvananthapuram, Keralam, India : Articles and compilations by Dr Achuthsankar S Nair
Articles by Achuthsankar S Nair on Sruthi Magazine, June 2013 and Journal of Madras Music Academy, 2009

External links 

 Swathi Thirunal Website
 Kerala Gov-Music
 Dr. Raja Rama Varma Rohani Thirunal, Prince of Mavelikara Palace
 John Caldecott
 The Edinburgh New Philosophical Journal, Volume 48

1813 births
1846 deaths
Malayali people
19th-century Indian monarchs
Performers of Hindu music
Carnatic composers
Swathi
Hindu monarchs
19th-century Indian composers
19th-century Indian astronomers
Musicians from Thiruvananthapuram
Indian male composers
Scholars from Thiruvananthapuram
19th-century male musicians